Le Botanique (French) or Kruidtuin (Dutch) is a cultural complex and music venue in Saint-Josse-ten-Noode, Brussels, Belgium. The building was previously the main orangery of the National Botanic Garden of Belgium and even as part of the garden had hosted cultural events. In 1958, the National Botanic Garden moved to Meise, Flemish Brabant. Le Botanique opened in 1984, and the gardens in front are now the Botanical Garden of Brussels.

History
The first botanical garden in Brussels belonged to the École Centrale of the department of the Dyle that was created during the French rule of Belgium at the end of the 18th century. Due to their costs, those French schools were soon dropped and some municipalities, including the City of Brussels, took over the garden that was about to be abandoned. In 1815, Belgium became part of the United Kingdom of the Netherlands. Around the same period, the maintenance costs of the garden were regarded as too high by the city administration. In 1826, a group of local bourgeois decided to create a new kind of botanical garden in Brussels. At the time the bourgeoisie was the new leading-class, and since companies were a popular financing method, the garden was created as a company. The creators thought it would be their contribution to the city's reputation. Although it was rooted on a private enterprise, it was also intended to be a national institution dedicated to science and botanical studies.

Both the City of Brussels and the Home Office supported the Botanical Garden financially. But, the Independence of Belgium (1830–31) was detrimental to the Dutch-born institution; it was regarded as orangist, as a mere playground for the local elites, and as not useful for the country's agriculture, among other critiques. From then on, the garden would have to battle to survive. The State and the City did not want to support it anymore unless it proved useful to the whole country, so the Botanical Garden was obliged to develop its commercial activities. It sold plants by the thousands, and created several money-consuming attractions and events for the local elite, like aquaria, a dance room, fairs, a fish nursery, concerts etc. In the 1860s, the aging buildings required renovation. The board of the Society of Horticulture tried to raise the money, but the costs were just too high for the company. In 1870, the Belgian Government took over the company. The National Botanic Garden was created in the very same year. Barthélemy Dumortier, a Belgian politician and botanist, had played a major role in this process. He wanted a "Belgian Kew" to be created in the capital, that is to say a botanical garden dedicated to taxonomy. That is why, some months before the garden was bought by the State, the Government had purchased the famous Von Martius Herbarium that was held in Munich. So, in 1870, Belgium had a great herbarium and an appropriate building. This marked the dawn of a new era for Belgian botany.

Cultural centre
Since 1984, Le Botanique has been the cultural centre for the French Community of Belgium. Until 2017, it managed the concert agenda for the nearby Cirque Royal, an entertainment venue able to hold seated audiences of 2,000, and more standing.

Nowadays, Le Botanique features a busy schedule of concerts, most taking place in either the 650-capacity orangery, the tall, circular rotunda with space for 300, or the vaulted Witloof Bar with 200 standing places. Other rooms in the building are typically used for art exhibitions or film screenings.

The annual Les Nuits Botanique ("The Botanical Nights") festival, held during the spring, sees a large number of musicians performing. In addition to the regular rooms, a marquee is frequently erected in the garden.

References

External links

 

Buildings and structures in Brussels
Saint-Josse-ten-Noode
Culture in Brussels
Concert halls in Belgium
Tourist attractions in Brussels